Mauro Antonio Pawlowski (born 24 April 1971) is one of the key figures in the Belgian contemporary music scene. He was born in Koersel and is of Italian and Polish descent.

He started his career as frontman of Evil Superstars in 1992. This group was, along with dEUS, part of the first wave of the Belgian music boom in the 90s. He split the band in 1998 and has since then played in numerous bands, including Mitsoobishy Jacson, Kiss my Jazz, Monguito and Shadowgraphic City, The Love Substitutes, Othin Spake, Club Moral, Archetypes of the Multisabanas, I Hate Camera, Mauro Pawlowski & the Grooms, Hitsville Drunks, Stahlmus Delegation and dEUS. Beside these projects, Mauro has released solo work under various aliasses: Mauro A. Pawlowski, Somnabula, while fronting a group called Gruppo di Pawlowski (2007 to date).

In 2008 he toured with the Dutch poet/writer Ramsey Nasr. From 2009 on, he has toured several times as a guitar player with Contemporary dance group Ultima Vez of Wim Vandekeybus.

Mauro composed music for Theater Zuidpool's rendition of Shakespeare's MacBeth (2010). He performed live music for de Roovers Alsemkomt (2014), for the hommage to Frank Zappa 'Terms of Embarrassment' with Flat Earth Society and Pierre Vervloesem (2014) and with the jazz band Hamster Axis of the One-Click Panther (2015) with pianist Bram Weijters, Janos Bruneel, Frederik Meulyzer and the saxophonists Andrew Claes and Lander Van de Noortgate. He developed the performative play "Transkamer" (2015) and HOL (2017) with the artist group FERDDND (2015) and actor Louis Van Der Waal.

Pawlowski left dEUS after a final concert in Antwerp in February 2017. He is currently a member of the duo Wall Streets (2017) with Remo Perrotti and member of the combo The Mechanics (2016 to date) with Eric Thielemans, Rudy Trouvé and Jean-Yves Evrard and Roman Hiele . He is fronting the Maurits Pauwels Band and presented his first album in Dutch : Afscheid in Kloten in 2016.

Equipment
Mauro plays among others a blonde '72 Fender Telecaster Thinline, a Springtime and an Airline Tuxedo.

Incomplete discography
 Evil Superstars : Hairfacts EP (1994)
 Evil Superstars : Love is Okay (1996)
 Kiss My Jazz : In Doc's Place, Friday Evening (1996)
 Evil Superstars : Remix Apocalyps EP (1996)
 Mitsoobishy Jacson : Nougat in Koblenz (1996)
 Mitsoobishy Jacson : Sun of Aerobics EP (1996)
 Evil Superstars : Boogie-Children-R-US (1998)
 Kiss My Jazz : In the Lost Souls Convention (1998)
 Galina : Lachen Met Liefde (1998)
 Mitsoobishy Jacson : Boys Together Outrageously (1999)
 Kiss My Jazz : In a Service Station (1999)
 Mauro : Songs from a Bad Hat (2001)
 Monguito : Trompete in God (2001)
 Kris De Bruyne : Buiten De Wet (2001)
 Sue Daniels : Paris (2001)
 Monguito : Operacion Megamix (2002)
 Mauro Antonio Pawlowski : Secret Guitar (2003)
 Mauro Pawlowski & The Grooms : Ghost Rock EP (2003)
 Shadowgraphic City : Shadowgraphic City (2004)
 Mauro Pawlowski & The Grooms : Black Europa (2004)
 Alex Chilton : Live in Anvers (2004)
 Somnabula : Swamps of Simulation (2004)
 The Parallels : The Parallels (2004)
 Mauro Pawlowski : Hallo, met Mauro (2004), promotional single
 Club Moral : Living(stone) (2004)
 Mauro Pawlowski & The Grooms : Tired of Being Young EP (2004)
 The Love Substitutes : Meet The Love Substitutes While the House is on Fire (2004)
 Deus : Pocket Revolution (2005)
 The Love Substitutes : More Songs about Hangovers & Sailors (2006)
 OTOT : Truth & Style (2006)
 Possessed Factory : Vol.1: Raised By Humans (2006)
 Othin Spake : The Ankh (2006)
 Bum Collar : Versatile Styles (2006)
 Horns : Horns, Halos & Mobile Phones (2006)
 Bum Collar : Topless Movies (DVD) (2007)
 Pawlowski, Trouve & Ward : S/T (2007)
 Possessed Factory : Vol.3 (2008)
 Deus : Vantage Point (2008)
 Othin Spake : Child of Deception and Skill (2008)
 The Parallels : Arabia in Blue (2008)
 Club Moral : Felix Culpa (2008)
 Mauro Antonio Pawlowski : Untertanz (2008)
 Mauro Pawlowski: "Original Music From The Performance Nieuwzwart" (2009)
 Mitsoobishy Jacson – The Confusion of A.J. Schicksal (2009)
 BOEST:Poezie (2010)
 Stahlmus Delegation – Untitled (2010)
 Radical Slave – Damascus (2010)
 Joe Berluck, Mauro Pawlowski: "Try A Little Love" (2010)
 Possessed Factory: "Giant on a Bicycle" (2011)
 Othin Spake: "The Nethack Dictionary" (2011)
 dEUS : Keep You Close (2011)
 Mauro Antonio Pawlowski: "Dynamic Wind Load Man" (2011)
 Stahlmus Delegation: "Shipwreck" (2012)
 dEUS : Following Sea (2012)
 Mauro Pawlowski: "Grown Savage" (2012)
 Possessed Factory: "Tribute to America" (2012)
 Ratzinger, Broodmes: "Ratzinger / Broodmes" (2012)
 dEUS: "Selected Songs 1994–2014" (2014) 
 Hitsville Drunks : Sincerely Average (2014)
 Gruppo di Pawlowski : Neutral Village Massacre (2014)
 Stahlmus Delegation: "When Stoke Stokes" (2014)
 Evil Superstars: "Galaxian Regression" (2014)
 Hamster Axis of the One Click Panther & Mauro Pawlowski: Insatiable (2015)
 Flat Earth Society: "Terms of Embarrassment" (2015)
 Various: "God Owes Us A Swimming Pool"(2016) 
 Ik Bahn Aanan : Voor Francis Rossi (2016)
 Mauro Pawlowski : Bordewijk Live (2016)
 Maurits Pauwels : Afscheid in Kloten (2016)
 Mauro Pawlowski, Craig Ward, Rudy Trouvé: "Pawlowski, Trouvé & Ward Vol. 2" (2017)
 Gruppo di Pawlowski : In Inhuman Hands (2017)
 The Mechanics: "The Mechanics are dancing in your head" (2017)

External links

 Mauroworld
 Future Archive Networks (Mauro's label)
 Mauro's podcast met compilaties van allerhande vinyl
 Mauro's backcatalogue podcast
 stahlmus.bandcamp.com

1971 births
Living people
Belgian rock guitarists
Belgian male guitarists
English-language singers from Belgium
Seven-string guitarists
Belgian people of Italian descent
Belgian people of Polish descent
People from Beringen, Belgium
21st-century Belgian male singers
21st-century Belgian singers
21st-century guitarists
Deus (band) members